Fireheart is a 2022 computer-animated adventure comedy film directed by Theodore Ty and Lauren Zeitoun and written by Zeitoun, Jennica Harper, and Daphne Ballon from a story by Zeitoun, Harper, and Lisa Hunter. It is the second film and final Independent film produced by L'Atelier Animation after Ballerina before Cinesite acquires L'Atelier. It features the voices of Olivia Cooke, Kenneth Branagh, Laurie Holden, and William Shatner. The plot follows a 16-year-old who dreams to become the world's first female firefighter.

Plot
Set in New York in 1932, the film centres on Georgia Nolan, a 16-year-old girl who hopes to become the world's first female firefighter despite being told as a child by her ex-firefighter father Shawn that women are not allowed to.

Shawn is requested by the mayor of New York to come out of retirement to head up a young team of firefighters to combat a serial arsonist, who uses purple gas to hypnotise others and has resulted in the disappearances of other firefighters. Wishing to help, Georgia disguises herself as a man named Joe and joins the team.

Cast
 Olivia Cooke as Georgia Nolan
 Maya Misaljevic as Young Georgia Nolan
 William Shatner as Jimmy Murray, the mayor of New York 
 Laurie Holden as Pauline
 Kenneth Branagh as Shawn Nolan, Georgia's father
 Ryan Garcia as Ricardo
 Wilex Ly as Jin
 Mara Junot as Laura Divine
 Scott Humphrey as Captain Neil
 Shoshana Sperling as the vocal effects of Ember, Georgia Nolan's Dalmatian.
 Mark Edwards as Pickle Vendor

Release
The film was released in the United States by Hulu in February 2022 exclusively on the service of the same name, and in Europe by Entertainment One throughout the rest of the year. It was then released as a Sky Cinema original by Sky on May 27, 2022, in the UK.

Reception
On the review aggregator website Rotten Tomatoes, 60% of four reviews are positive. The film grossed $3.7 million at the box office.

References

External links
 
 
 Fireheart at Library and Archives Canada

2020s adventure comedy films
2020s children's animated films
2022 computer-animated films
Animated films set in New York City
Films set in the 1920s
Films set in the 1930s
2020s English-language films
French films set in New York City
French adventure comedy films
Canadian adventure comedy films
2020s Canadian films
2020s French films